Chiang Mai City Football Club (Thai สโมสรฟุตบอลเชียงใหม่ ซิตี้), is a Thai football club based in, Chiang Mai Thailand. The club is currently playing in the 2018 Thailand Amateur League Northern Region.

Record

References

Association football clubs established in 2016
Football clubs in Thailand
Sport in Tak province
2016 establishments in Thailand